Albert Blattmann (8 September 1904 – 19 May 1967) was a Swiss cyclist. He competed in two events at the 1924 Summer Olympics. He was also the Swiss National Road Race champion in 1928.

References

External links
 

1904 births
1967 deaths
Swiss male cyclists
Olympic cyclists of Switzerland
Cyclists at the 1924 Summer Olympics
Cyclists from Zürich